Ganesan Srinivasan (born 1942) is an Indian physicist specializing in the field of condensed matter physics and astrophysics.  He is a visiting professor of the Indian Institute of Astrophysics and a former research scientist in the Raman Research Institute.

Biography
Srinivasan was born in Madurai, Tamil Nadu, in 1942. He finished his bachelor's degree from Nagpur University in 1962 and the master's degree from University of Madras in 1964. He completed his PhD from University of Chicago in 1970 under the supervision of Morrel H. Cohen. After working in various research institutes including Cavendish Laboratory at the University of Cambridge, he finally settled into the Raman Research Institute in 1976, until his retirement in 2004.

Books

Honors
Srinivasan is an elected fellow of the Indian Academy of Sciences from 1984. He is also the recipient of K. S. Krishnan Gold Medal, Jagirdar of Arni Gold medal and University of Madras PE Subramani Iyer Gold Medal. The Journal of Astrophysics and Astronomy published a special issue on Srinivasan's 70th birthday.

References

1942 births
Living people
Tamil scientists
Scientists from Tamil Nadu
Indian theoretical physicists
Indian astrophysicists
20th-century Indian physicists
University of Madras alumni
University of Chicago alumni